The 2008 Pattaya Women's Open was a women's tennis tournament played on outdoor hard courts. It was the 17th edition of the Pattaya Women's Open, and was part of the Tier IV Series of the 2008 WTA Tour. It took place in Pattaya, Thailand, from 2 February through 10 February 2008. First-seeded Agnieszka Radwańska won the singles title and earned $25,650 first-prize money.

Finals

Singles

 Agnieszka Radwańska defeated  Jill Craybas, 6–2, 1–6, 7–6(7–4)
It was Agnieszka Radwańska's 1st singles title of the year, and the 2nd of her career.

Doubles

 Yung-jan Chan /  Chia-jung Chuang defeated    Su-wei Hsieh /  Vania King, 6–4, 6–3

References

External links
 ITF tournament edition details
 Tournament draws